Muhammad Hazim bin Abu Zaid (born 17 January 2001) is a Malaysian professional footballer who plays as a forward for Malaysia Super League club Melaka United.

References

Living people
2001 births
People from Malacca
Malaysian people of Malay descent
Malaysian footballers
Melaka United F.C. players
Association football forwards